The Venus of Mierlo is the nickname of a prehistoric engraving on stone of a young woman which was found at Geldrop-Mierlo in the North Brabant province of Netherlands.

The name is, of course, purely modern, as the engraving predated by many millennia the Italian religion and the goddess Venus. There is no way of knowing what was the woman's name or those who made the engraving, and its exact cultural and religious significance is a matter of conjecture.

References

Prehistoric art
Archaeological discoveries in the Netherlands
History of North Brabant
Geldrop-Mierlo